Ernesto España (born November 7, 1954) is a Venezuelan former professional boxer who held the World Boxing Association lightweight championship in 1979 and 1980.

Career
España became a professional boxer in 1975 and won all of his bouts except one when he fought Claude Noel on June 16, 1979, for the vacant WBA lightweight title that had been given up by Roberto Durán. España knocked out Noel in the thirteenth round to win the title. He defended it once, recuperating from a knockdown in round seven before knocking out Johnny Lira in round nine of a fight which has been showcased on ESPN Classic, before losing the title to Hilmer Kenty by knockout in round nine in March 1980. In a rematch in September, Kenty knocked España out again, this time in the fourth round.

In 1981, he beat future champion Arturo Frias. When Frias won the WBA lightweight title, España challenged him but Frias avenged his only loss and won a technical decision over España in 1982.

España's next fight was another challenge for the WBA lightweight title, but this time Ray Mancini knocked him out in six rounds in July 1982. España never challenged for a world title again and retired in 1988.

His brother Crisanto España won the WBA world welterweight title in the early 1990s, when he beat Meldrick Taylor and lost it in his third defense to Ike Quartey.

External links
 

1954 births
Living people
World boxing champions
Lightweight boxers
World Boxing Association champions
Venezuelan male boxers
Venezuelan expatriate sportspeople in Puerto Rico